Oliver C. G. Harris is a British academic and Professor of American Literature at Keele University. He is the author and editor of fourteen books, including a dozen editions of works by William S. Burroughs: Letters, 1945–1959 (1993), Junky: the definitive text of Junk (2003), The Yage Letters Redux (2006), Queer (2010), The Cut-Up Trilogy, The Soft Machine, Nova Express, and The Ticket That Exploded (2014), Minutes to Go Redux (2020), The Exterminator Redux (2020), BATTLE INSTRUCTIONS (2020) and Dead Fingers Talk (2020). He is President of the European Beat Studies Network.

References

External links

Year of birth missing (living people)
Living people
Alumni of Christ Church, Oxford
Academics of Keele University